The Fuerteventura skink (Chalcides simonyi) is a species of skink in the family Scincidae. Skinks are lizards belonging to the family Scincidae, a family in the infraorder Scincomorpha.

Etymology
The specific name, simonyi, is in honor of Viennese naturalist Oskar Simonyi (1852–1915).

Geographic range
C. simonyi is found only on the islands of Fuerteventura and Lanzarote in the Canary Islands.

Habitat
The natural habitats of C. simonyi are temperate shrubland, Mediterranean-type shrubby vegetation, temperate grassland, rocky areas, pastureland, and urban areas.

References

Further reading
Steindachner F (1891). "Ueber die Reptilien und Batrachier der westlichen und östlichen Gruppe der canarischen Inseln ". Ann. K. K. Naturhistorischen Hofmuseums, Wien 6: 287–306. (Chalcides simonyi, new species, pp. 299–300). (in German).

Chalcides
Reptiles described in 1891
Taxa named by Franz Steindachner
Taxonomy articles created by Polbot
Reptiles of the Canary Islands